Josette is a 1937 French comedy film directed by Christian-Jaque and starring Fernandel, Josette Contandin and Lucien Rozenberg. The film's sets were designed by the art director Pierre Schild.

Cast
 Fernandel as Albert Durandal aka Albertal  
 Josette Contandin as Josette  
 Lucien Rozenberg as Le baron Samuel Rothenmeyer 
 Andrex as Lucien  
 Nicolas Amato as Le chanteur des rues  
 Robert Seller as Émile - le valet du baron  
 Jacqueline Prévot as Jeanne - la maman de Josette  
 Robert Arnoux as Rémy Doré 
 Mona Goya as La chanteuse Viviane Eros
 Joe Alex as Bamboula - le domestique noir  
 Anthony Gildès as Le professeur au concours de puériculture 
 Marcel Laporte
 René Lestelly
 Sinoël

References

Bibliography 
 Oscherwitz, Dayna & Higgins, MaryEllen. The A to Z of French Cinema. Scarecrow Press, 2009.

External links 
 

1937 films
French comedy films
1937 comedy films
1930s French-language films
Films directed by Christian-Jaque
French black-and-white films
1930s French films